This bibliography of The Bahamas is a list of English-language nonfiction books which have been described by reliable sources as in some way directly relating to the subject of The Bahamas, its history, geography, people, culture, etc.

Albury, Paul. The Story of the Bahamas.
Atlas of the Commonwealth of the Bahamas. 
Bangs, Outram – The Smaller Mockingbird of the Northern Bahamas. 
Barry, Colman J. – Upon These Rocks: Catholics in the Bahamas. 
Bell, H. MacLachlan – Bahamas: Isles of June. 
Bohlke, James E., Charles C. G. Chaplin, Eugenia B. Bohlke, and William F. Smith-Vaniz – Fishes of the Bahamas and Adjacent Tropical Waters. 
Bonhote, J. Lewis – ‘’List of Birds Collected on the Island of New Providence, Bahamas.’’ 
Brudenell-Bruce, P. G. C. – The Birds of the Bahamas. 
Buden, Donald W. – The Birds of the Southern Bahamas, an Annotated Check-List. 
Campbell, David G. - The Ephemeral Islands, a Natural History of the Bahamas.
Chapman, Frank M. – The Origin of the Avifauna of the Bahamas. 
Cloud, P. E. – Environment of Calcium Carbonate Deposition West of Andros Island, Bahamas. 
Craton, Michael – A History of the Bahamas. 
Crocker, John – Bermuda, the Bahamas, Hispaniola, Puerto Rico and the Virgin Islands. 
Crocker, John – The Caribbean and El Dorado. 
Defries, Amelia – The Fortunate Islands: Being Adventures with the Negro in the Bahamas. 
DeLoach, Ned – Reef Fish Behavior: Florida Caribbean Bahamas. 
Forbes, Rosita – A Unicorn in the Bahamas. 
Gilbert, Perry W., Robert W. Mathewson, and David P. Rall – Sharks, Skates, and Rays. A symposium, Bimini, Bahamas, January–February 1966. 
Ginsburg, Robert N. – Subsurface Geology of a Prograding Carbonate Platform Margin, Great Bahama Bank: Results of the Bahamas Drilling Project: SEPM Special Publication Series no. 70. 
Ginsburg, Robert N. – Tidal Deposits: A Casebook of Recent Examples and Fossil Counterparts. 
Gonsalves-Sabola, Joaquim C. – Law Reports of the Bahamas, 1965-1970. 
Hardie, L. A. – Sedimentation on the Modern Carbonate Tidal Flats of North-western Andros Island, Bahamas. 
Hughes, Colin A. – Race and Politics in the Bahamas. 
Humann, Paul – Reef Fish Identification: Florida, Caribbean, Bahamas. 
Johnson, Howard – The Bahamas from Slavery to Servitude, 1783-1933. 
Johnson, Howard – The Bahamas in Slavery and Freedom. 
Keegan, William F. – Bahamian Archaeology: Life in the Bahamas and Turks and Caicos before Columbus. 
Keegan, William F. – The People Who Discovered Columbus: The Prehistory of the Bahamas. 
Lewis, James A. – The Final Campaign of the American Revolution: Rise and Fall of the Spanish Bahamas. 
Lind, Aulis O. – Coastal Landforms of Cat Island, Bahamas. 
Marshall, Dawn I.  'The Haitian Problem'. Illegal Migration to the Bahamas. 
Maynard, C. J. – Corrected Descriptions of Five New Species of Birds from the Bahamas. 
Morton, Julia F. – Atlas of Medicinal Plants of Middle America: Bahamas to Yucatan. 
Northrop, John I. – A Naturalist in the Bahamas. 
Otterbein, Keith F. – The Andros Islanders: A Study of Family Organization in the Bahamas. 
Palmer, Robert – The Blue Holes of the Bahamas. 
 Paquette, Robert L. and Stanley L. Engerman – The Lesser Antilles in the Age of European Expansion. | issue = 2
Rankin, W. M. – The Northrop Collection of Crustacea from the Bahamas. 
The Real Bahamas in Music and Song. 
Reininger, Pete – The Bahamas: Islands of Song. 
Saunders, D. Gail and E. A. Carson – Guide to the Records of the Bahamas. 
Savage, Ernest A. – The Libraries of Bermuda, the Bahamas, the British West Indies, British Guiana, British Honduras, Puerto Rico, and the American Virgin Islands: A Report to the Carnegie Corporation of New York. 
Siegel, Peter K. and Jody Stecher – The Real Bahamas: African American Spirituals, Gospels, and Anthems in Old Rhyming Tradition. 
Slater, Mary – The Caribbean Islands. 
Smith, C. Lavett – National Audubon Society Field Guide to Tropical Marine Fishes of the Caribbean, the Gulf of Mexico, Florida, the Bahamas, and Bermuda. 
Smith, F. G. Walton – Atlantic Reef Corals: a Handbook of the Common Reef and Shallow-Water Corals of Bermuda, the Bahamas, Florida, the West Indies, and Brazil. 
The Sound of the Sun. 
Tavolga, William N. – Marine Bio-Acoustics: Proceedings of a Symposium Held at the Lerner Marine Laboratory, Bimini, Bahamas, April 11 to 13, 1963. 
Watt, Maurice J. – Report on a Visit to the British West Indies, the Bahamas and Bermuda. 
Wiedenmayer, Felix – Shallow-Water Sponges of the Western Bahamas: Experientia Supplementum 28. 
The Year Book of the Bermudas, the Bahamas, British Guiana, British Honduras and the West Indies, 1928. 
The Year Book of the Bermudas, the Bahamas, British Guiana, British Honduras and the West Indies, 1929. 
Zeledón, José C. – Description of a New Form of Spindalis zena from the Bahamas.

Notes

Bahamas
The Bahamas